Tonic water (or Indian tonic water) is a carbonated soft drink in which quinine is dissolved. Originally used as a prophylactic against malaria, tonic water usually has a significantly lower quinine content and is consumed for its distinctive bitter flavor, though nowadays it is often sweetened. It is frequently used in mixed drinks, particularly in gin and tonic.

History 
As early as the 17th century the Spanish used quinine from the bark of Cinchona trees to treat malaria after being shown the remedy from the Indigenous peoples of Peru, Bolivia, and Ecuador. 

In early 19th century India and other tropical posts of the British Empire, medicinal quinine was recommended to British officials and soldiers to prevent malaria, where it was mixed with soda and sugar to mask its bitter taste, creating tonic water.

The first commercial tonic water was produced in 1858 when it was patented by the owner of Pitt & Co., Erasmus Bond. The mixed drink gin and tonic also originated in British colonial India, when the British mixed their medicinal quinine tonic with gin and other ingredients to make the bitter medicine more palatable. Soldiers in India were already given a gin ration, so the sweet concoction was easy to make. In 1868 the first known record of a gin and tonic was in the “Oriental Sporting Magazine” and was described as a refreshing cocktail for spectators of horse racing, not as a medicine.

Quinine content 

Medicinal tonic water originally contained only carbonated water and a large amount of quinine. Most modern tonic waters contain comparatively less quinine, and are often enhanced by citrus flavors. As a result of the lower quinine content, tonic water is less bitter. It is also usually sweetened, often with the addition of high-fructose corn syrup or sugar. Some manufacturers also produce diet (or "slimline") tonic water, which may contain artificial sweeteners such as aspartame. Traditional-style tonic water with high amounts of quinine and carbonated water is less common, but may be preferred by those who desire the bitter flavor.

In the United States, the US Food and Drug Administration (FDA) limits the quinine content in tonic water to 83 ppm (83mg per liter), while the daily therapeutic dose of quinine is in the range of 500–1000mg, and 10mg/kg every eight hours for effective malaria prevention (2100mg daily for a  adult). It is often recommended as a relief for leg cramps, but medical research suggests some care is needed in monitoring doses. Because of quinine's risks, the FDA cautions consumers against using "off-label" quinine drugs to treat leg cramps.

Use

Tonic water is often used as a drink mixer for cocktails, especially gin and tonic. Vodka tonic is also popular. Tonic water with lemon or lime juice added is often known as bitter lemon or bitter lime. It is popular for its signature bitter but sweet taste. Another use of tonic water is in coffee. The espresso & tonic was created in Helsingborg, Sweden at Koppi Roasters after a staff party where they mixed tonic water, syrup, and an espresso. Since 2007, the drink has grown in popularity in Scandinavia, Europe, and the United States.

Negative effects 
Tonic water is known to cause fixed eruptions, which is a type of skin reaction to drugs, due to the quinine content. Various scientific journals have reported the repeated intake of tonic water can cause fixed eruptions with varying severity, with one reporting the onset of Stevens–Johnson syndrome. The cases of fixed eruptions were seen after the patients drank tonic water, by itself or mixed with gin. Some symptoms of the fixed eruptions include pigmented macules, high fever, erythematous plaques, and bullous. There is a higher chance of reaction if someone has an abnormal heart rhythm or low blood sugar, is pregnant, or has kidney or liver diseases.

Fluorescence 

The quinine in tonic water will fluoresce under ultraviolet light. In fact, quinine will visibly fluoresce in direct sunlight against a dark background. The quinine molecules release energy as light instead of heat, which is more common. The state is not stable and the molecules will eventually return to a  ground state and no longer glow.

See also 

Água de Inglaterra

References

External links 
 
 

Carbonated water
Drink mixers
Quinine
Soft drinks
Products introduced in 1858